Freeport, California is a census-designated place located approximately  south of downtown Sacramento  on California State Route 160.  Freeport lies on the eastern banks of the Sacramento River in Sacramento County.  The population was 58 at the 2020 census.

History
Nearly all goods traveling to Sacramento and the California Gold Rush came by boat from the Bay Area.  In the early 1860s businessmen grew tired of paying taxes at the Sacramento Embarcadero (port).  In 1862 Freeport Railroad Company was created with the idea of building a new port that was free of taxes.  Hence  “Freeport.”  The idea was to build a railway that bypassed Sacramento connecting with the Sacramento Valley Railroad at a midway point between Sacramento and Folsom.  The newly formed town boomed for three years with populations reaching 300-400.

Geography

According to the United States Census Bureau, the CDP covers an area of 0.04 square miles (0.1 km), all of it land.

Demographics

The 2010 United States Census reported that Freeport had a population of 38. The racial makeup of Freeport was 34 (89.5%) White, 0 (0.0%) African American, 0 (0.0%) Native American, 2 (5.3%) Asian, 0 (0.0%) Pacific Islander, 1 (2.6%) from other races, and 1 (2.6%) from two or more races. Hispanic or Latino of any race were 6 persons (15.8%).

The Census reported that 38 people (100% of the population) lived in households, 0 (0%) lived in non-institutionalized group quarters, and 0 (0%) were institutionalized.

There were 21 households, out of which 1 (4.8%) had children under the age of 18 living in them, 5 (23.8%) were opposite-sex married couples living together, 2 (9.5%) had a female householder with no husband present, 1 (4.8%) had a male householder with no wife present.  There were 1 (4.8%) unmarried opposite-sex partnerships, and 0 (0%) same-sex married couples or partnerships. 10 households (47.6%) were made up of individuals, and 2 (9.5%) had someone living alone who was 65 years of age or older. The average household size was 1.81.  There were 8 families (38.1% of all households); the average family size was 2.50.

The population was spread out, with 2 people (5.3%) under the age of 18, 1 people (2.6%) aged 18 to 24, 8 people (21.1%) aged 25 to 44, 17 people (44.7%) aged 45 to 64, and 10 people (26.3%) who were 65 years of age or older.  The median age was 56.5 years. For every 100 females, there were 216.7 males.  For every 100 females age 18 and over, there were 200.0 males.

The homeowner vacancy rate was 0%; the rental vacancy rate was 14.3%.  18 people (47.4% of the population) lived in owner-occupied housing units and 20 people (52.6%) lived in rental housing units.

References

Census-designated places in Sacramento County, California
Census-designated places in California